KUOS may refer to:

 KUOS-LP, a low-power radio station (92.1 FM) licensed to serve Sedona, Arizona, United States
 Franklin County Airport (Tennessee) (ICAO code KUOS)